The Prague Radio Symphony Orchestra (Symfonický orchestr Českého rozhlasu, Czech acronym SOČR, English acronym PRSO) is a Czech broadcast orchestra based in Prague, the Czech Republic. The SOČR performs concerts at the Dvořák Hall of the Rudolfinum, at the Forum Karlín and the Convent of Saint Agnes in Prague, as well as Studio 1 of Czech Radio in Prague.

History

The precursor ensemble of the SOČR was the Radiojournal Orchestra, which gave its first concert on 1 October 1926 under Jožka Charvát, the first chief conductor of the orchestra. By 1952, the popularity and size of the Radiojournal Orchestra was such that a second orchestra, the Prague Radio Symphony Orchestra, was split off from the Radiojournal Orchestra. By 1964, two separate orchestras were affiliated with Prague Radio, the Prague Radio Orchestra and the Prague Radio Symphony Orchestra. These orchestras subsequently combined to form the present orchestra.

Since the 2018–2019 season, Alexander Liebreich has been chief conductor and artistic director of the SOČR / PRSO. Liebreich stood down from the SOČR / PRSO at the close of the 2021—2022 season. In May 2021, the SOČR / PRSO announced the appointment of Petr Popelka as its next chief conductor, effective with the 2022—2023 season. The current principal guest conductor of the SOČR is Marek Šedivý. In May 2021, the SOČR / PRSO announced the appointment of Robert Jindra as its next principal guest conductor, effective with the 2022-2023 season. 

The SOČR / PRSO is a featured orchestra at such festivals as the Prague Spring International Music Festival, Dvořák Prague International Music Festival, Smetana's Litomyšl, Janáček Music Festival, or International Music Festival Český Krumlov.  The orchestra's discography includes the first set of complete recordings of Miloslav Kabeláč's eight symphonies (Supraphon, 2016).

Chief conductors
 Jožka Charvát (1927–1945)
 Josef Hrnčíř (1946)
 Karel Ančerl (1947–1950)
 Alois Klíma (1952–1971)
 Jaroslav Krombholc (1975–1981)
 František Vajnar (1982–1985)
 Vladimír Válek (1985–2011)
 Ondrej Lenárd (2011–2017)
 Alexander Liebreich (2018–2022)
 Petr Popelka (2022–present)

See also
 Radio orchestra

References

External links

 Official website of the Prague Radio Symphony Orchestra

Czech orchestras
Music in Prague
Musical groups established in 1926
1952 establishments in Czechoslovakia
Radio and television orchestras